USNS Flyer (T-AG-178), was a type C2-S-B1 cargo ship of the United States Navy, built for the Maritime Commission (MC) as Water Witch in service under charter by the Commission to several lines until purchased in 1946 by United States Lines and renamed American Flyer. After being placed in the Reserve Fleet 14 December 1964 the title was transferred to the Navy for use as a deep ocean bathymetric survey ship supporting installation of the Sound Surveillance System (SOSUS). The Navy placed the ship in service 9 February 1965 with the name Flyer given on 22 March. The ship operated in that role until 1975.

Construction
Water Witch was built under Maritime Commission] contract for MC hull 1209 by the Moore Dry Dock Company of Oakland, California, yard number 296. The keel was laid on 30 October 1944, and the ship launched on 20 December 1944, sponsored by Miss. Margaret Helen Finnel.

On registration the ship was assigned Official Number 247417 and signal ANQN. Registry information for American Flyer shows a crew of 54.

Service history

Commercial
The ship was completed 14 March 1945 and placed in service under Maritime Commission agreement with McCormick Steamship Company. On 6 July 1946 Water Witch was bareboat chartered by American South African Lines until 22 October 1946 when United States Lines acquired the ship under the MC agreement until purchasing the ship from the Maritime Commission on 8 November 1946 for $960,642.42. On 27 December 1946 the ship was renamed American Flyer.

On 10 October 1962 the title to American Flyer was surrendered to the Maritime Administration as trade in credit with the line operating the ship under a bareboat charter until delivery to the James River Reserve Fleet on 14 December 1964.

Navy auxiliary
The ship was acquired by the US Navy from the Maritime Administration (MARAD) in a permanent transfer and placed in service on 9 February 1965, with the name Flyer assigned on 22 March 1965.

Flyer was converted for Naval service as a Miscellaneous Auxiliary, bathymetric survey ship, designated T-AG-178, to perform deep ocean surveys for Project Caesar, the unclassified cover name for installation of the Sound Surveillance System (SOSUS). USNS Flyer was operated by the  Military Sea Transportation Service (MSTS) (current Military Sealift Command) for Project Caesar. The ship had a civilian MSTS crew of fourteen officers and thirty-seven seamen. A complement of civilian specialist would compose the survey party.

Fate
Flyer was struck from the Naval Vessel Register on 17 July 1975 and delivered to the custody of the Maritime Administration in the suisun Bay Reserve Fleet on 22 July 1975. On 27 April Flyer was sold for scrapping to American Ship Dismantlers, Inc.

References

External links
American Flyer photo, C2-S-B1 description

USNS Flyer (T-AG 178)
Flyer photo at IUSS ● CAESAR Alumni Association
Flyer conference room photo at IUSS ● CAESAR Alumni Association

 

1944 ships
Ships built in Oakland, California
World War II merchant ships of the United States
Cold War auxiliary ships of the United States
Type C2-S-B1 ships
Type C2-S-B1 ships of the United States Navy
Survey ships of the United States Navy